Mistikôsiwak (Wooden Boat People) is a pair monumental historical paintings ("Welcoming the Newcomers" and "Resurgence of the People") by the Canadian First Nations artist of mixed Cree and Irish descent, Kent Monkman.

The works were commissioned by the Metropolitan Museum of Art to comment from a native perspective upon their collection of Western Art. They formed part of an ongoing series of works commissioned by the museum to reflect upon the art institution's collection and the colonialist history of and the conditions in which the works were created and acquired.

The 2019 canvases are placed on opposite sides of the great hall of the museum and each measures almost  in size.

References

2019 in art
History paintings
Metropolitan Museum of Art